Name 
Vasiliki is a Greek name meaning "royal" that may refer to:

Vassiliki (given name)

Places 
Vasiliki, Lasithi, a village and an archaeological site in Lasithi, Crete, Greece
Vasiliki, Lefkada, a village on Lefkada, Greece
Vasiliki, Trikala, a municipal unit in Trikala regional unit, Greece

Other uses
Vasiliki Ware, a type of Minoan pottery
Vasiliki (film), a 1997 Greek film directed by Vangelis Serdaris
Vasiliki, a song by Stamatis Spanoudakis and Yiannis Xanthoulis, originally sung by Alkistis Protopsalti

See also 
Vasilisa (name), feminine Greek and East Slavic form of Basil